A Man Walks in the City (French: Un homme marche dans la ville) is a 1950 French drama film directed by Marcello Pagliero, and starring Jean-Pierre Kérien, Ginette Leclerc and Robert Dalban.

The film's sets were designed by art director Maurice Colasson.

Cast
 Jean-Pierre Kérien as Jean Sauviot  
 Ginette Leclerc as Madeleine  
 Robert Dalban as Laurent  
 Grégoire Aslan as Ambilarès  
 Yves Deniaud as Albert  
 André Valmy as Le commissaire  
 Dora Doll as La fille  
 Fréhel as La femme de Buck 
 Sylvie Deniau as La soeur de Madeleine  
 Christiane Lénier as Georgette  
 Maryse Paillet as Tantine  
 Fabien Loris as Dago  
 Pierre Léaud as L'ordonnateur  
 Grégoire Gromoff as Olen 
 Jérôme Goulven as Muller

References

External links 
 

1950 drama films
French drama films
1950 films
1950s French-language films
Films directed by Marcello Pagliero
French black-and-white films
1950s French films